BNS Gomati is an  offshore patrol vessel of the Bangladesh Navy. She was originally built as a Fishery Protection Vessel for the British Royal Navy, entering service as HMS Anglesey in 1979. She was sold to Bangladesh in 2002, entering service in 2003.

Design and description

The earlier ships of the class had suffered from excessive motions in high seas, and so Anglesey was fitted with fin stabiliser during build. Armament consisted of a single Bofors 40 mm gun backed up by two machine guns. The ship had a crew of 5 officers and 29 other ranks, plus a detachment of Royal Marines if necessary.

History
HMS Anglesey was laid down at Hall Russell's Aberdeen shipyard on 6 February 1978 and launched on 18 October 1978. She was commissioned into the Royal Navy on 1 June 1979. On commissioning she joined the Offshore Division of the Fishery Protection Squadron. On 13–14 August 1979, the Fastnet yacht race was hit by a severe storm, with Anglesey taking part in the resulting rescue operations, saving seven sailors from the yacht Bonaventure II.

In 2002 she was sold to the Bangladesh Navy.

Career
Gomati transferred on 12 September 2003. On 3 October 2004, she was commissioned into the Bangladesh Navy. She is currently serving under the command of the Commodore Commanding BN Khulna (COMKHUL).

Gomati took part in Exercise Aman in 2013, a multinational exercise held at Karachi port of Pakistan. She visited the port of Colombo, Sri Lanka from 23 to 26 February and Visakhapatnam Port in India from 17 to 20 March 2013 on goodwill missions.

See also
List of active ships of the Bangladesh Navy

References

Bibliography

External links
Image as HMS Anglesey

Ships of the Bangladesh Navy
Patrol vessels of the Bangladesh Navy
Island-class patrol vessels of the Bangladesh Navy
1978 ships
Ships of the Fishery Protection Squadron of the United Kingdom
Ships built by Hall, Russell & Company